Helen Lowe is a New Zealand novelist. Her first novel, Thornspell, was published in 2008. She has since published the first two books in The Wall of Night quartet, The Heir of Night and The Gathering of the Lost. Lowe is a three-time winner of the Sir Julius Vogel Award, and won the David Gemmell Morningstar Award for Best Fantasy Newcomer in 2012.

Biography
Lowe was born in Wellington in 1961. 
She attended schools in New Zealand and Singapore. She has a Bachelor of Arts in English and Geography from the University of Waikato.
Lowe continued her education at the Stockholm University and in 1984 earned a Postgraduate Diploma in Social Science.

The Wall of Night

Awards 

2012 The David Gemmell Morningstar Award
The Ursula Bethell Residency in Creative Writing, University of Canterbury
2011 The Heir of Night, Best Novel, Sir Julius Vogel Award
2010 The Heir of Night, A Single Titles Reviewers' Choice Award
2009 Thornspell, Best Novel: Young Adult, Sir Julius Vogel Award
Best New Talent, Sir Julius Vogel Award
Thornspell, Storylines NZ Children's Literature Trust "Notable Book"
2007 Argos, Winner, A2O Poetry Competition (Australia)
2005 New Zealand Society of Authors / Creative New Zealand Mentorship for Emerging Writers
2003 Rain Wild Magic, Winner, Robbie Burns National Poetry Competition

Current nominations 

2013 The Gathering of the Lost, shortlisted for The David Gemmell Legend Award

Bibliography

Author

 2009 Thornspell, Knopf, USA
 2010 The Heir of Night: The Wall of Night Book 1, HarperVoyager, USA; Orbit, UK
 2012 The Gathering of the Lost: The Wall of Night Book 2, HarperVoyager, USA; Orbit, UK
 2016 Daughter of Blood: The Wall of Night Book 3, HarperVoyager, USA; Orbit, UK

References

External links
Author website
New Zealand Book Council Profile

1961 births
Living people
University of Waikato alumni
New Zealand fantasy writers
New Zealand women writers
People from Wellington City